Sir Richard Clifford Tute was Chief Justice of the Bahamas from August 1932. He had previously been president of the Land Court, Jerusalem.

References 

Colony of the Bahamas judges
Year of birth missing
Year of death missing
Knights Bachelor